This article is about the demographic features of the population of Rwanda, including population density, ethnicity, education higher level, health of the populace, economic status, religious affiliations and other aspects of the population.
This country has few villages, and nearly every family lives in a self-contained compound on a hillside. The urban concentrations are grouped around administrative centers.

Over half of the adult population is literate, but no more than 5% have received secondary education.

Ethnic groups 

The Rwandan population largely consists of three ethnic groups. The Hutus, who comprise the majority of the population (85%), are farmers of Bantu origin. The Tutsis (14% before the Genocide, probably less than 10% now) are a pastoral people who arrived in the area in the 15th century. Until 1959, they formed the dominant caste under a feudal system based on cattleholding.

The Twa (pygmies) (1%) are thought to be the remnants of the earliest settlers of the region.

Population

In 1950, Rwanda had a very narrow population pyramid, with less than 250,000 males and females between 0–10 years old. The graph only gets narrower as it goes up with virtually no-one living past 50 years of age. In 2017, we see the population of Rwanda increase dramatically from 1950 with about 750,000 people between 0–20 years old, the graph remains very narrow in the older ages section but has improved from 1950. By 2050, it is predicted that more people will be living longer and the structure will broaden overall. By 2100, it is predicted that there will be more people aged between 30–60 than between 0–20 as previous years have shown.

The proportion of children below the age of 15 in 2010 was 42.6%, 54.7% was between 15 and 65 years of age, while 2.7% was 65 years or older
.

Structure of the population 

Structure of the population (1 July 2012 estimates, data refer to national projections):

Population Estimates by Sex and Age Group (01.VII.2019):

Vital statistics
Registration of vital events is in Rwanda not complete. The Population Department of the United Nations prepared the following estimates.

Fertility and Births
Total Fertility Rate (TFR) (Wanted Fertility Rate) and Crude Birth Rate (CBR):

Fertility data as of 2014–15 (DHS Program):

Life expectancy

Source: UN

Other demographic statistics 
Demographic statistics according to the World Population Review in 2022.

One birth every 1 minutes	
One death every 8 minutes	
One net migrant every 58 minutes	
Net gain of one person every 2 minutes

The following demographic are from the CIA World Factbook unless otherwise indicated.

Population
13,173,730 (2022 est.)
12,187,400 (July 2018 est.)
11,901,484 (July 2017 est.)

Religions
Protestant 57.7% (includes Adventist 12.6%), Roman Catholic 38.2%, Muslim 2.1%, other 1% (includes traditional, Jehovah's Witness), none 1.1% (2019-20 est.)

Age structure

0-14 years: 39.95% (male 2,564,893/female 2,513,993)
15-24 years: 20.1% (male 1,280,948/female 1,273,853)
25-54 years: 33.06% (male 2,001,629/female 2,201,132)
55-64 years: 4.24% (male 241,462/female 298,163)
65 years and over: 2.65% (2020 est.) (male 134,648/female 201,710)

0–14 years: 40.98% (male 2,521,169 / female 2,473,055)
15–24 years: 19.45% (male 1,187,249 / female 1,183,278)
25–54 years: 32.93% (male 1,903,087 / female 2,109,839)
55–64 years: 4.15% (male 225,273 / female 280,545)
65 years and over: 2.49% (male 120,952 / female 182,953) (2018 est.)

Birth rate
26.44 births/1,000 population (2022 est.) Country comparison to the world: 42nd
29.8 births/1,000 population (2018 est.) Country comparison to the world: 39th

Death rate
5.86 deaths/1,000 population (2022 est.) Country comparison to the world: 166th
6.3 deaths/1,000 population (2018 est.) Country comparison to the world: 154th

Total fertility rate
3.33 children born/woman (2022 est.) Country comparison to the world: 42nd
3.75 children born/woman (2018 est.) Country comparison to the world: 41st

Population growth rate
1.74% (2022 est.) Country comparison to the world: 53rd
2.3% (2018 est.) Country comparison to the world: 34th
2.45% (2017 est.)

Median age
total: 19.7 years. Country comparison to the world: 199th
male: 18.9 years
female: 20.4 years (2020 est.)

total: 19.2 years. Country comparison to the world: 200th
male: 18.5 years 
female: 20 years (2018 est.)

Total: 19 years
Male: 18.3 years
Female: 19.8 years (2017 est.)

Mother's mean age at first birth
23 years (2019/20 est.)
note: median age at first birth among women 25-49

Contraceptive prevalence rate
53.2% (2014/15)

Net migration rate
-3.21 migrant(s)/1,000 population (2022 est.) Country comparison to the world: 182nd
0.2 migrant(s)/1,000 population (2017 est.) Country comparison to the world: 68th

Dependency ratios
total dependency ratio: 77.3 (2015 est.)
youth dependency ratio: 72.4 (2015 est.)
elderly dependency ratio: 5 (2015 est.)
potential support ratio: 20.1 (2015 est.)

Urbanization
urban population: 17.7% of total population (2022)
rate of urbanization: 3.07% annual rate of change (2020-25 est.)

urban population: 17.2% of total population (2018)
rate of urbanization: 2.86% annual rate of change (2015-20 est.)

Life expectancy at birth
total population: 65.85 years. Country comparison to the world: 199th
male: 63.89 years
female: 67.86 years (2022 est.)

total population: 64.5 years (2018 est.)
male: 62.6 years (2018 est.)
female: 66.5 years (2018 est.)

total population: 64.3 years 
male: 62.3 years
female: 66.3 years (2017 est.)

Major infectious diseases
degree of risk: very high (2020)
food or waterborne diseases: bacterial diarrhea, hepatitis A, and typhoid fever
vectorborne diseases: malaria and dengue fever
animal contact diseases: rabies

Sex ratio
at birth: 1.03 male(s)/female
under 15 years: 1.01 male(s)/female
15–64 years: 0.99 male(s)/female
65 years and over: 0.70 male(s)/female
total population: 1.00 male(s)/female (2017 est.)

Nationality
noun: Rwandan(s)/Rwandese
adjective: Rwandan/Rwandese

85% Hutu, 14% Tutsi, 1% Twa.

Languages

Kinyarwanda only (official universal Bantu vernacular) 93.2%
 Kinyarwanda and other language(s) 6.2%
 French (official) and other language(s) 0.1%
 English (official) and other language(s) 0.1%
 Swahili (or Kiswahili used in commercial centers) 0.02%
 Other 0.03%
 Unspecified 0.3% (2002 est.)

Education expenditure 
3.4% of GDP (2020) Country comparison to the world: 133rd

Literacy
definition: age 15 and over can read and write
total population: 73.2%
male: 77.6%
female: 69.4% (2018)

total population: 70.5% 
male: 73.2% 
female: 68% (2015 est.)

School life expectancy (primary to tertiary education)
total: 11 years (2017)
male: 11 years (2017)
female: 11 years (2017)

Unemployment, youth ages 15-24
total: 1.9% (2014 est.)
male: 1.4% (2014 est.)
female: 2.5% (2014 est.)

See also
 Silas Niyibizi

References

 

pt:Ruanda#Demografia